Kharyyalakh is the name of several rural localities in the Sakha Republic, Russia:
Kharyyalakh, Gorny District, Sakha Republic, a selo in Odununsky Rural Okrug of Gorny District
Kharyyalakh, Khangalassky District, Sakha Republic, a selo in Tit-Arynsky Rural Okrug of Khangalassky District
Kharyyalakh, Namsky District, Sakha Republic, a selo in Kebekyonsky Rural Okrug of Namsky District
Kharyyalakh, Olenyoksky District, Sakha Republic, a selo in Kirbeysky Rural Okrug of Olenyoksky District
Kharyyalakh, Olyokminsky District, Sakha Republic, a selo in Solyansky Rural Okrug of Olyokminsky District
Kharyyalakh, Suntarsky District, Sakha Republic, a selo in Kyundyayinsky Rural Okrug of Suntarsky District
Kharyyalakh, Verkhnevilyuysky District, Sakha Republic, a selo in Kentiksky Rural Okrug of Verkhnevilyuysky District